The 1928–29 William & Mary Indians men's basketball team represented the College of William & Mary as a member of Virginia Conference during the 1928–29 NCAA men's basketball season. Led by L. Tucker Jones in his first and only season as head coach, the Indians compiled an overall record of 9–11 with a mark of 6–5 in conference play, placing fourth in the Virginia Conference. This was the 24th season of the collegiate basketball program at William & Mary, whose nickname is now the Tribe.

Schedule

|-
!colspan=9 style="background:#006400; color:#FFD700;"| Regular season

Source

References

William and Mary
William & Mary Tribe men's basketball seasons
William and Mary Indians basketball, men's
William and Mary Indians basketball, men's